The 2012 Russian Figure Skating Championships was held from December 25–29, 2011 in Saransk. Skaters competed in the disciplines of men's singles, ladies' singles, pair skating, and ice dancing.

The results were among the criteria used to select the teams sent to the 2012 World Championships, the 2012 European Championships, and the 2012 World Junior Championships.

Competitions

Medalists of most important competitions

Senior Championships
Top pairs' teams Tatiana Volosozhar / Maxim Trankov and Yuko Kavaguti / Alexander Smirnov appealed to the president of the Russian Figure Skating Federation, Alexander Gorshkov, to release them on medical grounds from participating in the championship, which is part of the selection process for the European and World Championships. Gorshkov said the pairs had earned their berths by virtue of their strong Grand Prix results and granted their exemptions from the Russian Championships. Nikolai Morozov, the coach of Grand Prix Final bronze medalist Alena Leonova, said she had also already earned her place in the team and could have missed the event but she chose to compete.

Evgeni Plushenko placed first in the men's short program, with Artur Gachinski and Zhan Bush in second and third respectively. Plushenko won his ninth national title. Gachinski won silver and Voronov climbed from fifth after the short to take the bronze medal.

Adelina Sotnikova won the ladies' short program, Ksenia Makarova was second, and Yulia Lipnitskaya third. Sotnikova won her third national title, Lipnitskaya won silver, and Leonova took bronze. In the free skate, Lipnitskaya earned the highest TES (technical elements score), followed by 12-year-olds Radionova and Medvedeva, who were ineligible for junior international competitions.

Vera Bazarova / Yuri Larionov took the lead in the pairs' short program, with Anastasia Martiusheva / Alexei Rogonov and Ksenia Stolbova / Fedor Klimov in second and third. Bazarova / Larionov won their first national title, while Stolbova / Klimov won silver and Martiusheva / Rogonov the bronze.

Ekaterina Bobrova / Dmitri Soloviev placed first in the short dance, with Elena Ilinykh / Nikita Katsalapov and Ekaterina Riazanova / Ilia Tkachenko in second and third respectively. Bobrova / Soloviev won their second national title, Ilinykh / Katsalapov won silver, and Riazanova / Tkachenko held on for the bronze although Pushkash / Guerreiro were third in the free dance. Riazanova was injured a couple of weeks before the event; she sustained a concussion and a broken nose when her partner accidentally elbowed her in practice.

The team to the European Championships was named on December 28, 2011. The World Championships team was announced on February 23, 2012, but only two ladies were confirmed, with the third lady (Makarova) confirmed on March 14.

Schedule
Local time, UTC/GMT +04:00

 Sunday, December 25
 14:00–14:30 – Opening ceremony
 14:45–16:15 – Short dance
 16:30–18:30 – Pairs' short
 18:45–21:15 – Men's short
 Monday, December 26
 14:00–16:30 – Ladies' short
 16:45–19:45 – Men's free
 20:00–22:00 – Free dance
 Tuesday, December 27
 16:00–18:25 – Pairs' free
 18:40–21:30 – Ladies' free
 Wednesday, December 28
 16:00–16:30 – Medal ceremonies
 16:45–19:15 – Exhibitions

Results

Men

Ladies

Pairs

Ice dancing

Junior Championships
The 2012 Russian Junior Championships were held in Novogorsk, Khimki from 5–7 February 2012.

Zhan Bush won the junior men's title. He and Artur Dmitriev Jr. received Russia's two berths to the World Junior Championships.

Adelina Sotnikova and Elizaveta Tuktamysheva were released from competing at the Russian Junior Championships and automatically assigned to the World Junior Championships. Yulia Lipnitskaya won the ladies' junior title, followed by Polina Shelepen and Elena Radionova. Lipnitskaya received the last available spot to Junior Worlds.

Vasilisa Davankova / Andrei Deputat won the junior pairs' title while Ekaterina Petaikina / Maxim Kurdyukov were the silver medalists and Kamilla Gainetdinova / Ivan Bich the bronze medalists. Deputat was released by Ukraine to skate for Russia at the World Junior Championships, along with the other medalists. In the free skate, Gainetdinova/Bich successfully landed side-by-side (sbs) triple lutzes, receiving 6.70 points for the element, and also included a sbs triple loop, double axel sequence, receiving 5.99 points due to some negative grades of execution.

Victoria Sinitsina / Ruslan Zhiganshin won gold while Alexandra Stepanova / Ivan Bukin took silver and Valeria Zenkova / Valerie Sinitsin the bronze. Along with Sinitsina / Zhiganshin and Stepanova / Bukin, Anna Yanovskaia / Sergei Mozgov were selected for Junior Worlds due to their Junior Grand Prix results.

Schedule
 Sunday, February 5
 14:00–16:30 – Men's short
 17:35–19:30 – Pairs' short
 19:45–21:15 – Short dance
 Monday, February 6
 14:00–16:30 – Ladies' short
 16:45-19:30 – Men's free
 19:45-21:30 – Free dance
 Tuesday, February 7
 13:00–15:15 – Pairs' free
 15:30–18:00 – Ladies' free

Results

Men

Ladies

Pairs

Ice dancing

References

External links
 Senior Championships: Starting orders and results at Figure Skating Federation of Russia
 Results and protocols, Event information at Figure Skating Federation of Russia
 Junior Championships: Starting orders and results at Figure Skating Federation of Russia
 Results and protocols, Event information, videos at Figure Skating Federation of Russia

Russian Figure Skating Championships
Russian Championships
Russian Championships
Figure Skating Championships
Figure Skating Championships